This is a list of notable people born, raised or resident in Belfast.

Arts

Business
 Thomas Andrews, shipbuilder
 Andrew Mulholland, flax manufacturer
 William Pirrie, 1st Viscount Pirrie, shipbuilder and politician
 Frank Carson, comedian
 Nauheed Cyrusi, actress, model, VJ
 Mary Gormley, beauty queen (Miss Universe Ireland 2000) 
 Mickey Marley, street entertainer
 Declan Mulholland, actor
 Ruby Murray, singer
 Holly Quin-Ankrah, actress
 Roy Walker, comedian
 Adrian Zagoritis, songwriter

Law
 Robert James McMordie, QC, Irish barrister, politician, and Lord Mayor of Belfast
 Professor Denis Moloney OBE, solicitor

Media
 Gerry Anderson (1944-2014), radio and TV presenter; born and raised in Derry
 Christine Bleakley (born 1979), TV presenter; born in Newry; grew up in Newtownards
 Andrea Catherwood (born 1967), newsreader; born and raised in Belfast
 Eamonn Holmes (born 1959), television presenter; born and raised in Belfast
 John Irvine, broadcast journalist; born and raised in Belfast
 Shauna Lowry (born 1970), television presenter; born and raised in Belfast
 Abeer Macintyre (born 1964), television and radio presenter; born in Amman and moved to Belfast in 1969
 Lyra McKee (1990-2019), journalist; born and raised in Belfast
 Colin Murray (born 1977), radio DJ and journalist; born and raised in Belfast
 Denis Murray (born 1951), broadcast journalist; born in Worcestershire and raised in Belfast
 Bill Neely (born 1959), broadcast journalist; born and raised in Belfast
 Stephen Nolan (born 1973), radio and TV presenter DJ; born and raised in Belfast
 Julian Simmons (born 1952), UTV, TV presenter and public figure; born in Kent and raised in Belfast
 Fionnuala Sweeney, CNN presenter and reporter; born and raised in Belfast

Military
 Bryan Budd, soldier and posthumous VC recipient
 Patrick Carlin, Victoria Cross recipient
 Colonel Tim Collins OBE, former commander, Royal Irish Regiment, British Army
 James Joseph Magennis, submariner and VC recipient
 William Frederick McFadzean, soldier and posthumous VC recipient

Politics

 Gerry Adams (born 1948), republican political leader
 Paddy Ashdown (1941-2018), former leader of the Liberal Democrats; born in New Delhi, brought up near Comber
 Tony Banks (1942-2006), later Lord Stratford, politician; born in Befast, grew up in London
 Sarah "Venie" Barr, political and community activist 
 May Blood, Baroness Blood (born 1938), Labour member of the House of Lords
 Robert Bradford (1941-1981), assassinated unionist politician; born in Limavady
 Sir William Cairns (1826-1886), colonial administrator and Governor of Queensland, Australia
 Mairead Corrigan (born 1944), Nobel Laureate (Peace)
 James Craig, 1st Viscount Craigavon (1871-1940), Prime Minister of Northern Ireland
 Reg Empey (born 1947), unionist political leader
 Frank Gault (1826-1896), member of the Wisconsin State Assembly
 Gerry Fitt (1926-2005), later Lord Fitt, nationalist political leader
 Chaim Herzog (1918-1997), sixth President of Israel
 Mary McAleese (born 1951), eighth President of Ireland
 David McCalden (1951-1990), far-right activist and AIDS victim
 Arlene McCarthy (born 1960), politician; Member of the European Parliament for North West England for the Labour Party from 1994 to 2014
 Henry Joy McCracken (1765-1798), leading member of the Society of the United Irishmen
 Adam McGibbon (born 1988), environmentalist and writer
 Julia McMordie (1860-1942), Ulster Unionist Party politician; first female High Sheriff of Belfast; born in Hartlepool
 Peter Robinaon (born 1948), unionist political leader and First Minister of Northern Ireland
 Bobby Sands (1954-1981), anti H-Block MP for Fermanagh and South Tyrone; hunger striker
 David Trimble (1944-2022), Nobel Peace Prize winner; first First Minister of Northern Ireland
 Betty Williams (1943-2020), Nobel Laureate (Peace)

Religious
 William Conway (1913-1977), Roman Catholic Archbishop of Armagh
 Henry Cooke (1788-1868), Presbyterian minister
 Robin Eames (born 1936), Church of Ireland Archbishop of Armagh

Science
 Thomas Andrews (1813-1885), chemist and physicist
Isobel Agnes Arbuthnot 1870–1963), botanist and botanical collector based in South Africa
 John Stewart Bell (1928-1990), physicist
 Jocelyn Bell Burnell (born 1943), astronomer (discoverer of pulsars); born in Lurgan
 Sidney Elisabeth Croskery (1901-1990), doctor; born in Gortgranagh, Killinure, County Tyrone
 John Boyd Dunlop (1840-1921), inventor and veterinary surgeon; born in Dreghorn, North Ayrshire, and studied to be a veterinary surgeon at the Dick Vet, University of Edinburgh, moving to Downpatrick, Ireland in 1867
 George Crawford Hyndman (1796–1867), biologist
 Charles Lanyon (1813-1889), architect; born in Eastbourne, Sussex; moved to Antrim in 1836 to become county surveyor until 1860; elected Mayor of Belfast in 1862
 William Lewis (1885–1956), Professor of Physical Chemistry, Liverpool; propounded collision theory
 William Thomson, 1st Baron Kelvin, OM, GCVO, PC, PRS, FRSE, (1824-1907), mathematical physicist, engineer, and leader in the physical sciences of the 19th century

Sport

 Tom Armstrong, football player
 George Best, football player
 Billy Bingham, football player and manager
 Danny Blanchflower, football player
 William Clay, football player
 Sammy Clingan, pro footballer
 Ray Close, boxer
 David Cullen, basketball player and 2007 winner of the Arthur Ashe for Courage Award at the ESPY awards for work with Peace Players International
 Joey Dunlop, international motorcycle champion
 Dave Finlay, professional wrestler
 Johnny Flynn, football player
 John Graham, NASCAR driver
 David Healy, football player
 Alex Higgins, former world snooker champion
 Eddie Irvine,  Formula One driver 
 Damaen Kelly, former professional boxer and Olympic bronze medalist
 Jim Magilton, football player and manager
 Wayne McCullough, former world champion boxer and Olympic medalist
 Alexander McDonnell, early 19th-century chess master
 Sammy McIlroy, football player
 Eric McMordie, football player
 Rinty Monaghan, former undisputed world flyweight boxing champion
 Alanna Nihell, boxer
 Owen Nolan, Ice hockey player
 Andrew Patterson, cricketer
 Mark Patterson, cricketer
 Mary Peters, athlete and Olympic gold medalist
 Paul Stirling, cricketer
 Tucker, professional wrestler
 John Watson, Formula One driver
 Norman Whiteside, football player

Other 

 John Bodkin Adams (1899-1982), doctor and suspected serial killer; born and raised in Randalstown; attended Queen's University Belfast; obtained post as general practitioner in Eastbourne in 1922 
 Hamish Kippen (1887-2008), Canadian fashion photographer and former junior athlete; born in Belfast, emigrated with family to Toronto in 1889
 Alexander Robinson (c. 1901-1995), boxer and loyalist paramilitary; born and lived in Belfast

References

Lists of people from Northern Ireland
People
Bel
Belfast